Turkish şalvar (pronounced shalvar,), Turkish trousers or dimiye are traditional baggy trousers gathered in tightly at the ankle. They are part of Turkish folk dress.

Men may wear the traditional loose coat, called jubba, over the şalvar. Other upper garments are also worn over or under şalvar.

Mustafa Kemal Atatürk Westernized the dress code in Turkey in the 1920s as part of his reforms. However, men and women still wear the şalvar in many areas of Turkey, indifferent to social status.

Similar pants in other cultures include the tshalvar, schalwar, salwar kameez, kaccha, patiala salwar, shintijan, sirwal, sharovary, aladdin pants, balloon pants, drop crotch pants, pantaloons, zouave, pluderhose and pumphose.

In female dress

The traditional clothing for women of Turkey includes the şalvar which is usually worn with upper garments of varying styles and lengths. The traditional şalvar suits are a part of Turkey's culture back to the Ottoman era. The şalvars are of varying degrees of bagginess and are gathered at the ankle. Bright colours and flowered prints are favoured by rural women. The total female ensemble includes the gömlek (chemise), şalvar and entari (robe).

In male dress
The traditional male dress includes the şalvar, yelek (vest) and cebken (jacket). The men's salvar is popular in eastern Turkey and are often wore by Kurdish men, especially in the districts of Mersin, Adana, Urfa and Diyarbakir.

See also 
 Knickerbockers
 Bloomers
 Harem pants

References

Turkish clothing
Ottoman clothing